Valentyn Kornienko (10 April 1939 – 22 February 2011) was a member of the Writer's Union of Ukraine and the winner of the Bohdan Lepky award. For almost 40 years he worked for publishing journals in Kiev.

Background
Valentyn Kornienko was born on April 10, 1939 in the village Krasilovka, Brovary region. In 1956 he graduated from the Ternopil secondary school number 1, Faculty of Kyiv University (1961, now - National University). At first the translator worked as a teacher in Ternopil. From 1965 to 2001 Kornienko was the editor of such youth publishings in Kyiv as "Dnipro", "Molod’", magazines "Ukraina", "Vsesvit", "UNESCO Courier" and others. He edited more than 200 books of fiction. Beginning in 2001 he translated the works of British, Italian, Slovakian, Polish and American writers. Kornienko is an author of essays, literary portraits of foreign and Ukrainian writers, articles, reviews.

Works
The creative achievements of Valentyn Kornienko include translations of Jack London creations ("Revolution", journalism ), Mark Twain (story), "The Farthest Station"), Graham Greene ("The Last Pope"), Herman Melville ("Billy Bud") Brian Moore ("The Great Victorian Collection" ), Barry Fenolyo ("Personal File"), Svatopluka Zlamany ("The Dark Figure Behind the Scenes"), Pauline Johnson ("The Two Sisters", legend ), Mary O Containers ("Caught Mustang"), Vladislav Tatarkevych ("History of the Six Concepts"), Francis Bret Hart ("Mrs. Skers Men", stories), Paul Stewart, Chris Ridella ("Burelov", "Winter Knights").

Valentyn Kornienko also translated Hrehetm Trin, Jaroslav Ivashkevich, Stephanie Hrodzensku, Walt Whitman, Petrarch, Vladimir Nef and Lubomir Mahachka, Jan Pynkovu, Irishman Sean O'Fauleyna, published the investigation of Bohdan Kravchenko "National Consciousness in Ukraine of the 20th Century", Sections of "History of Philosophy" (published by Publishing House "Osnova"), Scottish folk tale, novel in short stories of William Faulkner's "Fireside" (co-authored with Rostislav Dotsenko) and others.

Thanks to Valentin Kornienko world saw Lewis Carroll's book "Alice’s Adventures in Wonderland"  "Alice in Wonderland",  "Alice for Kids" in Ukrainian. After the publication of these books Ivan Dziuba said: "Finally we have a Ukrainian Alice, original sound of which shows us the Lukash school." Creative achievements of Valentyn Kornienko still impress: translations of Marcel Proust, Michel de Montaigne, William Faulkner. Valentyn Kornienko took place as well as the editor of two volumes of memoirs about Mykola Lukash. Kornienko's working languages were English, Polish and Czech.

In 2009 in Ternopil Publishing House "Bohdan" published his book "Autumn swallow. Favorites." Valentyn Kornienko also planned to translate "Ulysses" by James Joyce and to write a book about parents.

1939 births
2011 deaths
Ukrainian translators
20th-century translators